Thomas & Friends is a children's television series about the engines and other characters working on the railways of the Island of Sodor, and is based on The Railway Series books written by the Reverend W. Awdry.

This article lists and details episodes from the eighth series of the show, which was first broadcast in 2004. This series was narrated by Michael Angelis for the United Kingdom audiences, while Michael Brandon narrated the episodes for the United States audiences.

This was the first series produced by HIT Entertainment.

Production
Starting with this series, Thomas & Friends was broadcast in the United States as a whole television programme. It had first appeared in the form of sequences on the American television show Shining Time Station, which ran from 1989 to 1995.

This series saw the introduction of a new opening  and new closing credits, as well as a brief description of the Island of Sodor before each episode began. Also starting with this series, the length of the episodes were increased to seven minutes from the original four-and-a-half minutes. The Series was broadcast in a "half hour format" that included 2 episodes of Series 8 as well as a short episode from Series 7 in the middle of the airing. In addition, it also included educational segments and additional songs. For the United States broadcasts, other changes included the additions of CGI sequences in mini-segments between episodes, transition effects, and an intro section.

For the eighth series, Steve Asquith (who had worked on the show for 20 years as a crew member) took over as director from David Mitton (who had directed the show since its first series) and Simon Spencer became the producer. In addition, Robert Hartshorne and Ed Welch took over as composers and songwriters after Mike O'Donnell and Junior Campbell departed. Paul Larson and Abi Grant were the script editors for this series.

The theme song for this new series was an instrumental version of "Engine Roll Call" composed by Ed Welch. Two arrangements were recorded. One was used in the opening for the CITV airings of series 8, while the other was used as the opening for the PBS and Nick Jr. airings of series 8–10 in the US, as well as the closing music for series 8–18. The CITV arrangement can also be heard on the menus of DVD releases of series 8 episodes.

The series was produced using digital Betacam Sp video cameras, which created a somewhat different look for the show. There was also a subtle shift towards the use of CGI elements; these were provided by HiT Entertainment's subsidiary HOT Animation (which made Bob the Builder, Rubbadubbers and the later version of Pingu for CBeebies), but filming remained at Shepperton Studios.

This series was also the first series that saw the use of The Steam Team, the centralised cast of eight characters:  Thomas, Edward, Henry, Gordon, James, Percy, Toby and Emily.

Filming for series 8 started in early 2004. In May of that year, several episodes were released direct-to-video in the US on the Steamies vs. Diesels VHS/DVD, and in the UK on the All Aboard with the Steam Team VHS/DVD. The series premiered on television in the UK on August 1, 2004, and in the US on September 5, 2004.

Episodes

Characters

 Thomas
 Edward
 Henry
 Gordon
 James
 Percy
 Toby
 Emily
 Diesel
 Mavis
 'Arry and Bert
 Salty
 Harvey
 Arthur
 Spencer
 Annie and Clarabel
 Troublesome Trucks
 Bertie
 Harold
 Cranky
 Elizabeth
 The Fat Controller
 Stephen Hatt
 Farmer McColl
 Sodor Brass Band
 Murdoch (does not speak)
 Trevor (does not speak)
 Lady Hatt (does not speak)
 The Refreshment Lady (does not speak)
 Allicia Botti (does not speak)
 The Duke and Duchess of Boxford (do not speak)
 Henrietta (cameo)
 George (cameo)
 Caroline (cameo)
 Butch (cameo)
 Tiger Moth (cameo)
 Bridget Hatt (cameo)
 Mrs. Kyndley (cameo)
 Jem Cole (cameo)
 Farmer Trotter (cameo)
 Nancy (cameo)
 Cyril (cameo)
 Toad (faceless cameo)
 City of Truro (picture cameo)
 Donald and Douglas (mentioned)

References

Notes

Citations

2004 British television seasons
Thomas & Friends seasons